Jérémie Boga (born 3 January 1997) is a professional footballer who plays as a midfielder for  club Atalanta. Born in France, he plays for the Ivory Coast national team.

Coming through Chelsea's youth system, Boga spent the 2015–16 season on loan to Rennes and the 2016–17 season with Granada, also on loan, before making his first-team debut for Chelsea in August 2017. He then joined EFL Championship club Birmingham City on loan for the remainder of the season. In 2018, he moved to Italian club Sassuolo on a permanent deal.

Internationally, Boga represented his native France up to under-19 level, but then chose to play for his parents' country, Ivory Coast, at senior level. He was also eligible to represent England.

Club career

Chelsea

In 2008, Boga joined Chelsea from ASPTT Marseille as a youngster when he moved with his family to London, where his father worked. He was educated at Richard Challoner School in New Malden. After impressing in Chelsea's Academy, he earned himself his first professional contract, therefore keeping at the London-based club until 2017.

He was named on the bench for Chelsea's final game of the 2014–15 season, a 3–1 victory against Sunderland in the Premier League, but he remained unused.

Loan to Stade Rennais
On 31 August 2015, Boga joined Rennes on a season-long loan to gain first team experience since his impressive spell in the Chelsea youth system. He made his debut on 18 September, as an 82nd-minute substitute for Paul-Georges Ntep in a 1–1 draw with Lille in Ligue 1. At the beginning of October, Boga made a single appearance for Rennes' reserve team against GSI Pontivy, in which he scored the only goal of the game, converting a penalty in the first-half. On 28 November 2015, in his first start for the team, Boga scored his first professional goal, against Stade de Reims which resulted in a 2–2 draw. His second goal of the season took the Round of 64 Coupe de France match against OGC Nice into extra time. The game went to penalties, and Rennes won the shootout 7–6. On 9 January 2016, Boga scored his third goal of the season in a 2–2 draw with Lorient.

Loan to Granada
On 6 July 2016, Boga joined La Liga club Granada on a season-long loan. He made his Granada debut on 20 August in a 1–1 draw with Villarreal, playing the full 90 minutes. A week later, Boga scored his first goal in a 5–1 home defeat against Las Palmas, scoring Granada's equalizer after Las Palmas took the lead through former Liverpool player Nabil El Zhar. On 2 April 2017, Boga scored the equalizing goal against Barcelona. Granada lost the game 4–1.

Chelsea debut and loan to Birmingham City
Boga returned to Chelsea for the 2017–18 season and unexpectedly started in their first game of the season against Burnley. However, he was substituted in the 18th minute after Gary Cahill was sent off. He signed a new three-year contract with Chelsea before, on 28 August 2017, joining Championship club Birmingham City on loan for the 2017–18 season.

He was one of six debutants in Birmingham's next fixture, away to Norwich City. He played the whole match as his team lost 1–0, and continued in the side for the next five league matches. Incoming manager Steve Cotterill imposed a fitness programme on the players, and on Boga in particular, who did not start another match for two months. When he did return, in a 1–1 draw away to Sheffield United on 25 November, he opened the scoring with his first goal for Birmingham. After the defence failed to clear a corner, "an unmarked Boga jinked on the edge of the area before thumping a curling effort past Blackman's outstretched hands"; the goal won him the club's Goal of the Season award. Two weeks later, with his side losing 1–0 away to Fulham with 15 minutes left, he missed a penalty, hitting his shot too high. Cotterill continued to select Boga, and he scored his second Birmingham goal with a powerful header in a 3–1 win against Sunderland in late January that lifted his team out of the relegation positions. He played less under Cotterill's successor, Garry Monk, and not at all in the last few weeks of the season, as Birmingham narrowly avoided relegation. In all competitions, he made 34 appearances, 25 of which were starts.

Sassuolo
On 21 July 2018, he moved to Sassuolo on a permanent transfer for a fee reported to be around £3.5 million.

Atalanta
On 24 January 2022, Boga moved to Atalanta, initially on loan, with Atalanta holding an obligation to make the deal permanent.

International career
Boga has been capped by France at under-16 and under-19 levels. In April 2017, it was announced that Boga had committed to playing for the Ivory Coast internationally. He was called up to the Ivory Coast national team for the first time for a friendly match against the Netherlands and an African Cup of Nations qualifier against Guinea on 4 and 10 June 2017. He made his debut in the latter, coming on for Jean Michaël Seri in the 77th minute of a 3–2 home defeat.

Personal life
Boga was born in Marseille, France, to Ivorian parents. On 19 August 2020 he tested positive for COVID-19.

Career statistics

Club

International

Scores and results list Ivory Coast's goal tally first.

Honours
Chelsea Youth
FA Youth Cup: 2013–14, 2014–15
Professional U21 Development League: 2013–14
UEFA Youth League: 2014–15

References

External links

Profile at the Atalanta B.C. website

1997 births
Living people
Footballers from Marseille
French footballers
Ivorian footballers
Association football midfielders
Chelsea F.C. players
Stade Rennais F.C. players
Granada CF footballers
Birmingham City F.C. players
U.S. Sassuolo Calcio players
Atalanta B.C. players
Ligue 1 players
La Liga players
Premier League players
English Football League players
Serie A players
France youth international footballers
Ivory Coast international footballers
2021 Africa Cup of Nations players
French expatriate footballers
Ivorian expatriate footballers
Expatriate footballers in England
Expatriate footballers in Italy
Expatriate footballers in Spain
French expatriate sportspeople in England
French expatriate sportspeople in Italy
French expatriate sportspeople in Spain
Ivorian expatriate sportspeople in England
Ivorian expatriate sportspeople in Italy
Ivorian expatriate sportspeople in Spain
French sportspeople of Ivorian descent
Citizens of Ivory Coast through descent